Yummy Yummy (Chinese: 雅米雅米, also known as Food for Life) is an episodic drama filmed by Singapore's now defunct SPH MediaWorks and Hong Kong's Television Broadcasts Limited in a joint collaboration. It was released in August 2005. The series is notable for being one of the few Singaporean co-productions in a language other than English or Mandarin Chinese.

Synopsis
After meeting on game show called Yummy Yummy, five contestants keep in touch and become friends.  They face with a number of challenges as they attempt to open a restaurant together, but in the end their friendships persevere.
Daniel Yau (Raymond Lam Fung) is the only son of a wealthy restaurant owner. 
Chan Ka Lok (Kevin Cheng Ka Wing) is a poor, but nice boy who works at his family's shop that sells chickens. 
Mandy Chow (Charmaine Sheh Shi Man) is an orphan who learned to be independent after her parents were divorced and her mother died. Yan Chow (Tavia Yeung Yi) is the younger sister of Mandy and loves to eat dried foods, especially dried lemons. Mandy and Yan did not know they were sisters until they became good friends.
Terry Ng (Ben Yeo Chee Long) lives in Singapore with his bossy mother and quiet father. Terry joined Yummy Yummy because he discovered that the contestants would receive the chance to go to Hong Kong. Terry's girlfriend, Jane lived in Hong Kong and he wanted to find her. 
Chan Ka Bo (Natalie Tong Si Wing) is the younger sister of Chan Ka Lok. She met Terry because he was one of her brother's good friends. Yuko Leong (Michelle Chia Yun-Ee) is the only daughter of a wealthy businessman. She is a rich, spoiled girl who lived in Singapore. Daniel met Yuko while the contestants of Yummy Yummy visited Singapore. She accused Daniel of scratching her BMW because she saw him touching the scar on her car. In the game show, Chan Ka Lok, Daniel Yau, Terry Ng and Yan Chow are on the yellow team. Mandy Chow is one of the managers of Yummy Yummy. In the end, they found out that they have something in common.

Cast

Other cast
Mimi Chu
Peter Yu
Chen Huihui
Shaun Chen as 吴世龙
Adam Chen as Rambo
Lynn Poh
Michelle Chia as Yuko Leong
Natalie Tong

Awards and nominations
2007 Astro WLT TV Drama Awards-Favorite Characters-Yau Hock Lai(Raymond Lam), Chan Ga Lok (Kevin Cheng) and Mandy Chow Man Hei (Charmaine Sheh)

Singaporean television co-productions
Singapore Chinese dramas
TVB dramas
2005 Singaporean television series debuts
2005 Singaporean television series endings
2005 Hong Kong television series debuts
2005 Hong Kong television series endings